Jakub Hyman (born April 16, 1984 in Jablonec nad Nisou) is a Czech luger who has competed since 2003. Competing in two Winter Olympics, he earned his best finish of 27th in the men's singles event at Turin in 2006.

Hyman also finished 31st in the men's singles event at the 2007 FIL World Luge Championships in Igls.

References
 
 FIL-Luge profile

External links 
 
 
 

1984 births
Living people
Czech male lugers
Olympic lugers of the Czech Republic
Lugers at the 2006 Winter Olympics
Lugers at the 2010 Winter Olympics
Sportspeople from Jablonec nad Nisou